Islam in Iceland is a minority religion. The Pew Research Center estimated that the number of Muslims in Iceland was below its 10,000 minimum threshold, and official statistics put the figure at under 1,300, or 0.33% out of the total population of 385,230.In 2011, Icelandic Muslims attracted the interest of Al Jazeera; the channel planned a documentary dealing with Muslims in Iceland and New Zealand. Al Jazeera was interested in how Ramadan is honored in the higher latitudes where the night can be of unusual length when compared to the majority-Muslim lands.

History
The earliest mention of Iceland in Muslim sources originates in the works of Muhammad al-Idrisi (1099–1165/66) in his famous Tabula Rogeriana, which mentions Iceland's location in the North Sea.

The long-distance trading and raiding networks of the Vikings will have meant that various Icelanders, like the Norwegians Rögnvald Kali Kolsson or Harald Hardrada, came into direct contact with the Muslim world during the Middle Ages; indirect connections are best attested by finds of Arabic coins in Iceland, as also widely in the Viking world.

Following Iceland's conversion to Christianity around 1000, some Icelanders encountered the Islamic world through pilgrimage, for example to Jerusalem, of the kind described by Abbot Nikulás Bergsson in his Leiðarvísir og borgarskipan.

From around the late thirteenth century, a fantastical version of the Islamic world is prominent in medieval Icelandic romance, partly inspired by Continental narratives influenced by the Crusades. Although this image generally characterises the Islamic world as 'heathen', and repeats the misconceptions of Islam widespread in the medieval West, it also varies substantially from text to text, sometimes, for example, associating the Islamic world with great wealth, wisdom, or chivalry. Romance continued to serve as a medium for Icelanders to contemplate Islam in the post-medieval period, for example in Jón Oddsson Hjaltalín's eighteenth-century romance Fimmbræðra saga, which combined traditional storytelling with Continental Enlightenment scholarship.

Perhaps the earliest known example of Muslims coming to Iceland occurred in 1627, when the Dutch Muslim Jan Janszoon and his Barbary pirates raided portions of Iceland, including the southwest coast, Vestmannaeyjar, and the eastern fjords. This event is known in Icelandic history as the Tyrkjaránið (the "Turkish Abductions"). An estimated 400-800 Icelanders were sold into slavery.

Islam started to gain presence in Icelandic culture around the 1970s, partly through immigration from the Islamic world (for example Salmann Tamimi) and partly through Icelanders' exposure to Islamic culture while travelling (for example Ibrahim Sverrir Agnarsson). Some of the immigrants simply came of their own accord; others came as refugees, including groups from Kosovo. The Quran was first translated into Icelandic in 1993, with a corrected edition in 2003.

Demographics

Salmann Tamimi estimates that when he came to Iceland in 1971 there were perhaps seven Muslims living there. As of 2013, however,

"Muslim Association of Iceland" (Félag múslima á Íslandi) has 465 members.
"The Islamic Cultural Centre of Iceland" (Menningarsetur múslima á Íslandi) has 305 members.

The first generation of Muslims born in Iceland probably began with people like Salmann's own children, such as Yousef Ingi Tamimi (b. 1988). Iceland's Muslim population is of diverse origins, including people born in the Arab world, Albania, Africa, and Iceland.

Organisations

Muslim Association of Iceland
The Muslim Association of Iceland (Félag múslima á Íslandi) was founded in 1997 by Salmann Tamimi, a Palestinian immigrant; it was officially recognised on February 25. Since 2010 the chair has been Ibrahim Sverrir Agnarsson. As of 2014, the association has 465 members. More than half were born in Iceland; perhaps 40-50 were born to non-Muslim parents.

The Muslim Association of Iceland currently runs the Reykjavík Mosque, a Sunni mosque on the third floor of an office building in Ármúli 38, Reykjavík. It has two imams and offers daily and nightly prayers attended by a mix of local Icelanders and visiting Muslims. It also offers weekly Friday prayers for Jumu'ah. In 2000 the Muslim Association applied to purpose-build a mosque in Reykjavík; after a long process, permission for building was granted on July 6, 2013.

Prayers are said in Arabic, but English and Icelandic are also widely used due to the diverse nature of the congregation. The Association regularly runs courses in both Arabic and Icelandic. On Saturdays there are Quran lessons for kids of different ages.

Islamic Cultural Centre of Iceland
The Islamic Culture Centre of Iceland (Menningarsetur múslima á Íslandi) was founded in 2008 by Karim Askari, originally from Morocco, and as of 2014 has 305 members. The Centre hired Ahmad Seddeeq, originally from Egypt, as Imam in 2011.

The Islamic Cultural Centre of Iceland runs a mosque in Ýmishúsið on Skógarhlíð in Reykjavík.

Discrimination
One of the main researchers on Icelandic attitudes to racial and religious groups, Kristín Loftsdóttir, has found that many Icelanders exhibit anti-immigrant discourses linked with Islamophobia in ways parallel those in other European countries, despite Iceland having an often completely different history of contact with Islamic cultures. Many public expressions of Islamophobia have in the second decade of the twenty-first century been focused on opposition to the creation of a purpose-built Reykjavík mosque. Opposition to Islam is often presented in terms of support for gender equality, a discourse which in Kristín's assessment is 'used as a way to dwell on the criticism of Muslims in general, and to the glory of European societies'. Óttar M. Norðfjörð's 2010 novel Örvitinn eða; Hugsjónamaðurinn satirises Islamophobic attitudes.

Many Muslims in Iceland prefer not to join a formal organisation, considering their relationship with God a personal one.

Religious organisation affiliation

See also
Religion in Iceland
Islam in the Arctic
Islam in Europe
Islam by country
European Islam
Bahá'í Faith in Iceland
Iceland–Palestine relations
Reykjavík Mosque
Islam

References

External links
islam.is